Alan Lopes Pinheiro (アラン・ピニェイロ, born 13 May 1992) is a Brazilian professional footballer who plays as a forward for RANS Nusantara.

Club statistics
Updated to 23 February 2018.

Honours
Esporte Clube Vitória
Campeonato Baiano (1): 2013
Campeonato Baiano Runners-Up (1): 2012
Copa do Brasil Sub-20 (1)

References

External links

Profile at Tokyo Verdy

1992 births
Living people
Brazilian footballers
Brazilian expatriate footballers
Esporte Clube Vitória players
Ceará Sporting Club players
Kawasaki Frontale players
Tokyo Verdy players
JEF United Chiba players
J1 League players
J2 League players
Expatriate footballers in Japan
People from Brumado
Association football forwards
Sportspeople from Bahia